John Watts (born 23 April 1939) is a British athlete. He competed in the men's discus throw at the 1972 Summer Olympics. Watts remains an active Masters athlete, winning the 2018 World Masters Athletics Championships.

References

1939 births
Living people
Athletes (track and field) at the 1972 Summer Olympics
British male discus throwers
Olympic athletes of Great Britain
Place of birth missing (living people)